Coleophora monardella is a moth of the family Coleophoridae. It is found in North America, including Iowa and Ontario.

The larvae feed on the leaves of Monarda species, including Monarda fistulosa. They create an annulate case.

References

monardella
Moths described in 1933
Moths of North America